British Steel Corp v Cleveland Bridge and Engineering Co Ltd [1984] 1 All ER 504 is an English contract law case concerning agreement.

Facts
Steel nodes delivered to defendants after letter of intent to buy, but no formal contract had been concluded because the claimants refused to use the defendants’ terms, and negotiations took so long. No agreement was reached on progress payments and liability for late delivery, and defendants refused to pay because of lateness and nodes coming out of sequence. They had, however, been delivered.

Judgment
Robert Goff J gave three alternatives, so (1) intent letter could have been an executory contract, but was not because negotiations were going on (2) the defendants' terms were a standing offer accepted by beginning the work, but that was presumptuous (3) so the best solution is to allow restitutionary recovery for the value of the work done. The nodes were a benefit at the expense,

See also

English contract law

References

English contract case law
High Court of Justice cases
1984 in case law
1984 in British law
Steel industry of the United Kingdom